Joaquín Rodríguez Espinar (born 28 November 1982 in Paradas, Seville, Andalusia), known simply as Joaquín, is a Spanish former footballer who played as a forward.

References

External links

1982 births
Living people
People from Campiña de Morón y Marchena
Sportspeople from the Province of Seville
Spanish footballers
Footballers from Andalusia
Association football forwards
Segunda División players
Segunda División B players
Tercera División players
Sevilla Atlético players
UB Conquense footballers
CP Cacereño players
CD San Roque de Lepe footballers
CE Sabadell FC footballers